NADH-cytochrome b5 reductase 1 is an enzyme that in humans is encoded by the CYB5R1 gene.

Structure 
The CYB5R1 gene is located on the 1st chromosome, with its specific location being 1q32.1. The gene contains 9 exons. CYB5R1 encodes a 34.1 kDa protein that is composed of 305 amino acids; 56 peptides have been observed through mass spectrometry data.

References

External links

Further reading 

 
 
 
 
 

Enzymes
Genes